Erphaea stigma is a species of longhorn beetles of the subfamily Lamiinae. It was described by Martins and Monné in 1974, and is known from northwestern Brazil, French Guiana, and eastern Ecuador.

References

Beetles described in 1974
Acanthocinini